Hidden Valley Outlaws is a 1944 American Western film directed by Howard Bretherton and written by John K. Butler and Robert Creighton Williams. The film stars Wild Bill Elliott, George "Gabby" Hayes, Anne Jeffreys, Roy Barcroft, Kenne Duncan and Charles Miller. The film was released on April 2, 1944, by Republic Pictures.

Plot

Cast
Wild Bill Elliott as Bill Elliott 
George "Gabby" Hayes as Gabby Hayes
Anne Jeffreys as June Clark
Roy Barcroft as Gilbert J. Leland
Kenne Duncan as Henchman Ben Bannon
Charles Miller as Daniel Clark
John James as Danny Clark
Fred Toones as Snowflake 
Budd Buster as Ned Murphy
Tom London as Sheriff McBride
LeRoy Mason as The Whistler
Earle Hodgins as Eddie Purcell
Yakima Canutt as Vigilante Tracy

Production

Filming locations
Hidden Valley Outlaws was filmed in Iverson and Corriganville Movie Ranch in California.

See also
List of American films of 1944

References

Citations

Sources

External links 
 

1944 films
American Western (genre) films
1944 Western (genre) films
Republic Pictures films
Films directed by Howard Bretherton
American black-and-white films
1940s English-language films
1940s American films